Mark Christopher Ruskell (born 14 May 1972) is a Scottish Green Member of the Scottish Parliament (MSP). He was elected to represent Mid Scotland and Fife from 2003−2007, then elected again in 2016 and re-elected in 2021. In the Scottish Parliament, Ruskell is the Greens' spokesperson on Climate, Energy, Environment, Food and Farming.

Early life
Mark Ruskell was born on 14 May 1972. He was educated at Edinburgh Academy and at Stevenson College, Edinburgh, a further education college in the city. He studied environmental science and biology at the University of Stirling, graduating with a Bachelor of Science (BSc) degree, and sustainable agriculture at the Scottish Agricultural College and University of Aberdeen, graduating with a Master of Science (MSc) degree.

Political career
In 2003 he was elected to represent Mid Scotland and Fife. He sat on the Scottish Parliament Environment and Rural Development Committee and served as its Deputy Convenor. He lost his seat in the 2007 elections.

In May 2012 he was elected to represent the Dunblane and Bridge of Allan ward of Stirling Council in the Scottish local elections, the first time the Scottish Green Party has had a representative on the council. He stepped down at the 2017 elections to concentrate on his role as a MSP. His party colleague Alasdair Tollemache replaced him as Councillor for Dunblane and Bridge of Allan at the 2017 poll.

His political career has involved fighting numerous campaigns for the Greens including standing in the 2001, 2010 and 2015 UK Westminster General Elections for Stirling and in every Scottish Parliament election since 1999.

In March 2015, the Scottish Greens announced that Ruskell had been selected as the lead candidate for their Mid Scotland and Fife regional list, following a ballot of their members. and was subsequently elected. On 23 May he was announced as the Scottish Greens spokesperson on Climate, Energy, Environment, Food and Farming. He currently sits as a Member of the Environment, Climate Change and Land Reform Committee.

References

External links
 
Councillor Mark Ruskell at Stirling Council

1972 births
Living people
Scottish Green Party councillors
Scottish Green Party MSPs
Members of the Scottish Parliament 2003–2007
Members of the Scottish Parliament 2016–2021
People educated at Edinburgh Academy
Alumni of the University of Stirling
Alumni of the University of Aberdeen
Alumni of Scotland's Rural College
Members of the Scottish Parliament 2021–2026